Ebro in the Morning is an American radio show based in New York City hosted by Ebro Darden, Peter Rosenberg, and Laura Stylez. It currently airs from 6 to 10am. Common topics of discussion on the show include national news, politics, and celebrity gossip.

History 
Ebro in the Morning was established in 2012 when the then Programming Director Ebro Darden rejoined the Hot 97 morning show. Ebro formerly worked alongside several past Hot 97 morning show co-hosts from 2004 to 2007, before rejoining the team in 2012. Since joining the show Ebro Darden has caused controversy on multiple occasions due to statements he has made on the show including his beef with rapper 6ix9ine, and calling the Jersey City Public School District "trash".

Syndication 
On November 16, 2020, Alpha Media included Ebro in the Morning under its syndicated "WE" branded stations, which made the show on in Amarillo, Portland, and San Antonio

Ebro in the Morning also broadcasts on several "Loud" branded stations across the Lehigh Valley, Reading and State College in Pennsylvania; including WHOL/WEST, WIOV, and WRSC-FM-HD3.

Segments 
 Ride or Die
 Curved
 Flashing Lights
 Guru Talk
 Congratulations You Played Yourself
 Laura Never Loses
 97 Minutes Commercial Free Hip Hop (occurred from 7:10am to 8:47am)
 White-ish Wednesdays

References 

American radio programs
Radio controversies